Michael Lorenzo Urie (born August 8, 1980) is an American actor. He is known for his portrayal of Marc St. James on the ABC dramedy television series Ugly Betty. He can be heard as Bobby Kerns in As the Curtain Rises, an original podcast soap opera from the Broadway Podcast Network.

Early life and education
Urie was born in Houston, Texas, and raised in Plano. He is of Scottish and Italian descent. He graduated from Plano Senior High School in 1998.

Urie then studied at Collin County Community College before being accepted at the Juilliard School in New York City. While there, he was a member of the Drama Division's Group 32 from 1999 to 2003. Urie graduated from Juilliard in 2003.

Career
Urie, while still a student at Juilliard, performed in the world premiere of Love and Happiness (2001) at the Consolati Performing Arts Center, starring as a sixteen-year-old trying to get rid of his mother's boyfriend.

He received the 2002 John Houseman Prize for Excellence in Classical Theatre from the Juilliard School. His classical credits include Shakespeare, Jacobean drama, and commedia dell'arte.

Urie played the central character in the stage play WTC View as well as in the film adaptation.

He is on the board of Plum Productions and serves as its casting director. With the same company he has produced and appeared in Prachtoberfest and lowbrow (and a little bit tacky). As a freelance producer, he has worked on Like The Mountains and The Fantasticks (Four Players Theatre). He also directed the latter production.

In 2006, Urie began appearing in the ABC dramedy Ugly Betty as Marc St. James, the assistant of Wilhelmina Slater, played by Vanessa Williams. The show began with the concept that Wilhelmina would have a different assistant in each episode; thus Urie was originally billed as a guest star in the credits. However, Williams loved their chemistry, and Urie was signed on as a full-time regular midway through the first season. He and the cast were nominated for Screen Actors Guild awards for Outstanding Performance by an Ensemble in a Comedy Series in 2007 and 2008. The role earned Urie a Ewwy Award nomination for Best Supporting Actor in a Comedy Series in 2009. He remained with Ugly Betty until the show's cancellation in 2010.

During the 2007–08 Writers Guild of America strike, Urie hosted TLC's reality-based series Miss America: Reality Check. The program followed the contestants participating in the 2008 Miss America Pageant.

Urie has returned often to his theater roots, including directing a one-night celebrity-performed staging of Howard Ashman's unproduced musical Dreamstuff. The musical was reimagined by Howard's partners Marsha Malamet and Dennis Green and performed one night only at Los Angeles's Hayworth Theatre as part of the Bruno Kirby celebrity reading series. He has also been on Live with Regis and Kelly and has also starred in the 2008 Disney blockbuster production Beverly Hills Chihuahua as the voice of Sebastian.

Urie originated the role of Rudi Gernreich in the 2009 off-Broadway play The Temperamentals, about the foundation of the early LGBT rights organization the Mattachine Society. Urie received a Lucille Lortel Award for Outstanding Lead Actor.

In January 2012, Urie made his Broadway debut, joining the cast of the second revival of How to Succeed in Business Without Really Trying in the role of Bud Frump.

Urie has also started his own website for videoblogging and live chats. In 2012, Urie also starred as the mysterious limo driver James in the film adaptation of Wendy Mass's children's book Jeremy Fink and the Meaning of Life, written and directed by Tamar Halpern.

Urie was one of the leads in CBS's short-lived series Partners. The multi-camera comedy, from Will & Grace creators Max Mutchnick and David Kohan, centered on lifelong friends and business partners – one straight and one gay. The series premiered on September 24, 2012, but was cancelled after only six episodes had aired.

His performance in 2013's one-man show Buyer & Cellar won him a Clarence Derwent Award as well as a Drama Desk Award for Outstanding Solo Performance.

In April 2015, Urie became the host of Cocktails & Classics on Logo TV, in which he and panels of celebrity friends watch and comment on classic movies while imbibing cocktails named or made for the films. Films profiled on the series have included All About Eve, Steel Magnolias, Valley of the Dolls, Breakfast at Tiffany's, and Mommie Dearest.

In November 2018, Urie starred as Arnold Beckoff in Harvey Fierstein's Torch Song revival on Broadway.

He had a recurring role as Redmond, the gossipy book agent, in the popular TVLand drama-comedy series Younger, produced by Darren Star.

In 2018, Urie played Prince Hamlet in the Shakespeare Theatre Company's production of Hamlet in Washington, DC. He reprised the role in mid-2019 for the company's "Free for All" production run.

On September 13, 2019, it was announced that Urie would once again team up with his Ugly Betty co-star Becki Newton on a sitcom project for CBS and Warner Bros. Television called Fun, for which both would co-star and co-executive produce with creator Michael Patrick King and fellow Ugly Betty showrunners Tracy Poust and Jon Kinnally. CBS passed on the pilot of the series on May 4, 2020.

In 2021, Urie starred in the Netflix Christmas romantic comedy Single All the Way.

Personal life
In 2009, Urie referred to himself as "a member of the LGBT community" on his website. In a 2010 interview with The Advocate, he said that he was in a relationship with a man and identifies as "queer". He said it never felt wrong when he was with women previously.

Filmography

Film

Television

Director and executive producer

Theater

References

External links
 
 
 
 Entertainment Weekly interview with Michael Urie and the actors who portray TV assistants Lloyd (Entourage) and Kenneth (30 Rock).
 Interview from Broadway World (August 21, 2007)

1980 births
21st-century American male actors
American male film actors
American male stage actors
American male television actors
American people of Italian descent
American people of Scottish descent
Drama Desk Award winners
Juilliard School alumni
American LGBT actors
LGBT male actors
LGBT people from Texas
Living people
Male actors from Texas
Queer actors
Queer men
Participants in American reality television series
People from Plano, Texas
Theatre World Award winners